Julian Vittorio Cubillos (born March 21, 1991) is an American singer, songwriter, producer and multi-instrumentalist.

Early life

Cubillos was born in Torrance, California. He began playing guitar at age 5 and studied jazz and ethnomusicology at Los Angeles County High School for the Arts and UCLA.

Career

In 2013, Cubillos traveled to New York City to participate in the 14th edition of the Red Bull Music Academy.

In 2014, he released his third record, Evil, on New York-based record label Tiny Montgomery.

Musical style

Cubillos' musical style has been described with a wide array of categorizations including "jazzy lo-fi," psychedelic, garage rock and electropop. His recordings have been described as sounding "terrible."

Discography

Studio albums

 Youth (2010)
 Grand Prize (2012)
 Evil (2014)

Singles

 I Explode the Bully with My Mind (2014)
 Bon Courage (w/ Tom Csatari) (2014)
 Scared (2016)

Production credits

 Outro Waltz by Tom Csatari Band (2015)
 Broken Now by East of Eden (2015)
 BrandCore™ / Escarpments by Uncivilized (2016)

References

External links
 Official website
 Julian Cubillos on AllMusic

1991 births
Living people
21st-century American singers
Musicians from Torrance, California